, also known as  or , is a mountain in Tottori (formerly Mochigase), Tottori Prefecture, Japan.

Mt. Misumi is a granite mountain with a sharply pointed triangular summit. It was a holy mountain in the Shugendō faith, and was believed in legend to be the residence of the kami Sarutahiko.

Misumi Shrine is found at the base of the mountain. The main hall of the shrine is a designated cultural asset of the city of Tottori.

References

Tottori (city)
Mountains of Tottori Prefecture